Biser Boyadzhiev (born 31 October 1948) is a Bulgarian rower. He competed in the men's coxless four event at the 1972 Summer Olympics.

References

1948 births
Living people
Bulgarian male rowers
Olympic rowers of Bulgaria
Rowers at the 1972 Summer Olympics
Sportspeople from Plovdiv